Nikolaevo may refer to the following places in Bulgaria:

Nikolaevo, town in Stara Zagora Province
Nikolaevo, Gabrovo Province
Nikolaevo, Pernik Province
Nikolaevo, Plevna Province
Nikolaevo, Sliven Province
Nikolaevo, Veliko Tarnovo Province